The New Clark City Athletics Stadium is a multi-purpose stadium located at the New Clark City in Capas, Tarlac, Philippines. It is the primary venue of the New Clark City Sports Hub, which is part of the National Government Administrative Center. It hosted the athletics events and the closing ceremony of the 2019 Southeast Asian Games.

Construction
The construction of the whole New Clark City Sports Hub, which also includes the Athletics Stadium, began on April 25, 2018 with a cement-pouring ceremony. The cost of the stadium including the nearby training track oval and a field for throwing sports costed around  billion.
By early July 2019, the stadium is already 98 percent complete and the track oval is already available for use to Filipino athletes.

With the stadium almost complete by September 1, 2019, the first event held in the stadium was the final leg of the Philippine Athletics Track and Field Association weekly relay, a qualifier for athletes aspiring to represent the Philippines at the 2019 Southeast Asian Games, on that day. The construction of the stadium was finished on October 12, 2019, or 50 days ahead of the opening of the 2019 Southeast Asian Games.

Architecture and design
Local architecture firm, Budji + Royal Architecture + Design, were commissioned by the Bases Conversion Development Authority to work on the New Clark City Sports Hub. This also marks the first time that Budji + Royal Architecture + Design worked on a sports facility project and the first team involved in the project referred to the technical guidelines set by the International Association of Athletics Federations for the athletics stadium.

The Athletics Stadium itself had its design was derived from Mount Pinatubo, with its posts and facade made from lahar or volcanic debris from the volcano. Its ringed roofline was made to resemble a crater and be defined by a series of curving canopies. The main facade or the main entrance was ornated with glassframes. and its pillars are painted orange to represent the local sunset. The shade of the anti-corrosive paint, provided by Norwegian firm Jotun, is patented and is branded as "B+R Active Orange". The pillars, inspired from the framework of the parol, supports the seating structure of the stadium as well as its roofing.

The stadium has an open-shed architecture and a raised roofline as a remedy against the tropical and humid climate of its locale. The structure is further ventilated by wind tunnels and its insulated oval roof. There are no pillars obstructing the view towards the center of the stadium from its seating area with lights hung at the catwalk of its canopy.

Lead architect Royal Pineda describe the result of the approach in designing the stadium and the rest of the sports complex as a "practical luxury" or a deviation from relying on expensive materials to come up with an elegant result. The open ceiling allows the installation of additional utilities without dismantling the stadium's ceiling board or doing any repainting works. The structural frames and lahar concrete were deliberately left unpainted for easy maintenance. The stadium and surrounding facilities are also engineered to resist earthquakes of up to 8.9 magnitude. The concept of "practical luxury" is also described as maximizing the facility's usable space.

The Athletics Stadium was nominated for the Jury Award of Stadium of the Year 2019 of StadiumDB.com, an online database for stadiums. The New Clark City stadium was among the ten shortlisted stadiums being considered for the award. The stadium was also nominated for the Engineering Prize and the Sport Completed Building category award for the 2021 edition of the World Architecture Festival (WAF)

Facilities

The stadium which sits on a footprint of  has a seating capacity for 20,000 people and has 21 rows of seats.

It is graded as a Class 1A Athletics Facility certified by the International Association of Athletics Federations, the first athletics facility in the Philippines to be so. The stadium also hosts a  nine-lane standard athletics oval The rubberized track was provided by Polytan. The stadium also has radio receivers installed that would allow the measuring of athletes performing in the venue through RFID timing. An outdoor track nearby the stadium used for warm-up is also equipped with the same technology.

It will also have a football field of natural grass which according to developer AlloyMTD will satisfy FIFA standards.

A warm-up area is also hosted in the stadium which has equipment provided by Technogym and an indoor rubber track also provided by Polytan.

Use

The stadium can be used to host various sporting events including athletics or track and field, and football, and also for the concert events. It hosted the closing ceremony of the 2019 Southeast Asian Games. It also the home stadium of United City F.C.

Football matches 
2022–23 Philippines Football League

Gallery

See also
List of football stadiums in the Philippines
New Clark City Aquatics Center
Philippine Sports Stadium
Rizal Memorial Stadium
Panaad Stadium
Biñan Football Stadium

References

Buildings and structures in Tarlac
Athletic Stadium
Athletics (track and field) venues in the Philippines
Football venues in the Philippines
Sports venues completed in 2019
Southeast Asian Games stadiums
Southeast Asian Games athletics venues